Oretta is a census-designated place in Beauregard Parish, Louisiana, United States. As of the 2010 census, it had a population of 418.

Geography
Louisiana Highway 27 leads through the center of the CDP, leading north  to DeRidder, the parish seat, and south  to DeQuincy in Calcasieu Parish.

Demographics

References

Census-designated places in Louisiana
Census-designated places in Beauregard Parish, Louisiana